The Iona Gaels women's basketball team represents Iona University in New Rochelle, New York in NCAA Division I competition. The school's team competes in the Metro Atlantic Athletic Conference (MAAC).

History
The Gaels beat Quinnipiac 79–76 to win their first ever MAAC title in 2016. They lost 74–58 to Maryland in the First Round of the 2016 NCAA Division I women's basketball tournament. They have also made the Women's National Invitation Tournament in 2007, 2008, 2010 and 2014, going to the Second Round in 2007 and 2008.

NCAA Division I appearances
The Gaels have made one NCAA Division I Tournament appearance. They have a record of 0–1.

WNIT appearances
The Gaels have made the Women's National Invitation Tournament five times. They have a record of 2–5.

References

External links